Chris Lemons (born November 21, 1979) is an American soccer player who plays for FC Wichita.

Career

Youth and college
Lemons was born in Wichita, Kansas. He was a two time All State high school soccer player before attending Oklahoma Christian University where he was a 2000 NAIA honorable mention All American and a 2001 third team All American.

Professional
In 2002, Lemons moved to Wales where he played with Cwmbran Town A.F.C.  In 2003, he signed with the Virginia Beach Mariners of the USL First Division, playing part of the season on loan to the Indiana Blast.  In 2004, he moved to the Charlotte Eagles of the USL Second Division.  In 2007, he moved to the Cleveland City Stars of USL-2.  In August and September 2007, he went on loan to the Colorado Rapids of Major League Soccer. He never gained a first team roster spot, but played a handful of games with the Rapids Reserves.

On April 16, 2008, Lemons signed with the Carolina RailHawks of the USL First Division. He played twenty-one games with the RailHawks, but did not return for the 2009 season. Instead, he signed with the Charlotte Eagles on March 31, 2009.

Lemons left Charlotte after the 2010 season. He was signed by the Wichita Wings of MISL in 2011

References

External links
 Wichita Wings Player Profile

Living people
1979 births
American expatriate soccer players
North Carolina FC players
Charlotte Eagles players
Cleveland City Stars players
Colorado Rapids players
Cwmbrân Town A.F.C. players
Indiana Blast players
Oklahoma Christian Eagles men's soccer players
USL First Division players
USL Second Division players
Virginia Beach Mariners players
Soccer players from Wichita, Kansas
American soccer players
Association football midfielders
American expatriate sportspeople in Wales
Expatriate footballers in Wales
FC Wichita players
Wichita B-52s
Wichita Wings (2011–2013 MISL) players
Major Indoor Soccer League (2008–2014) players
Professional Arena Soccer League players
National Premier Soccer League players